Gaz Kohan (also romanized as Gāz Kohan, Gāz Kahan, and Gāz Kahn) is a village in Javar Rural District, in the Central District of Kuhbanan County, Kerman Province, Iran. At the 2006 census, its population was 40, with 11 families.

References 

Populated places in Kuhbanan County